The David Bohnett Foundation is a global private foundation that gives grants to organizations that focus on its core giving areas – primarily Los Angeles area programs and LGBT rights in the United States, as well as leadership initiatives and voter education, gun violence prevention, and animal language research. As of 2022, the foundation has donated $125million to nonprofit organizations and initiatives.

History
Immediately after selling his popular internet social-network company GeoCities to Yahoo! in 1999, David Bohnett turned his attention to activism. He created the David Bohnett Foundation, "a nonprofit grant-making organization focused on providing resources for organizations pursuing societal change and social justice through activism", with an initial endowment of $32million. According to the Los Angeles Times Magazine, he "invests where he can actually improve lives, empower individuals and build viable communities in meaningful ways". To serve as executive director and strategist for his foundation he hired Michael Fleming, who had been a media leader for the American Civil Liberties Union.

In 2000, the foundation's first full year, it donated $2 million to LGBT organizations, AIDS services, gun control programs, and voter registration initiatives. Bohnett's initial grants included large donations to GLAAD, the Family Equality Council, and the Human Rights Campaign. A prime aim for Bohnett is to "create an environment which destigmatizes homosexuality", and to that end he has funded both national gay rights organizations and also local LGBT organizations and centers across the U.S. The nationwide LGBT centers he has funded and created include numerous LGBT CyberCenters – safe-haven internet cafes where LGBT young people and seniors, and disadvantaged, troubled, or closeted gays, can find support and resources, including computers and internet access. Bohnett created the first CyberCenter in 1998, and as of 2021 there are 58 David Bohnett CyberCenters in the U.S.

Grantmaking
The David Bohnett Foundation provides grants to outside nonprofit organizations and projects supporting several primary funding areas: The Fund for Los Angeles, supporting a broad spectrum of arts, educational and civic programs; LGBT-related causes; graduate school leadership programs at the University of Michigan, New York University and Harvard University; voting rights and registration initiatives; supporting research and public policies to reduce the impact of firearm violence; leadership training initiatives for political public service; and animal research and rights.

Fund for Los Angeles
The David Bohnett Foundation Fund for Los Angeles provides support to local organizations that are working to better the civic and cultural lives of people living in Los Angeles. These grants are made under the initiative of either David Bohnett or the David Bohnett Foundation. As of 2021, the foundation has disbursed over $72,000,000 to recipients of funding from the Fund for Los Angeles.

Fund for Los Angeles grant recipients
A selection of Fund for Los Angeles grant recipients includes:

LGBT community

The David Bohnett Foundation supports organizations and projects using social activism to advance the rights of the lesbian, gay, bisexual, and transgender (LGBT) community. The foundation also assists and promoted philanthropic organizations that foster positive portrayals of lesbians and gay men in the media. As of 2021, the foundation has disbursed over $24,753,000 to groups and organizations that strive to provide equal rights and protections for all LGBT people.

LGBT community grant recipients
A selection of LGBT community grant recipients includes:

CyberCenters

The David Bohnett Foundation has sponsored CyberCenters since 1998, with the first one established at the Los Angeles Gay and Lesbian Center. Now there are CyberCenters across the United States, in locations like Atlanta, Tulsa, Orlando, San Francisco and New York City. The David Bohnett CyberCenters are another major undertaking. Numbering 58 locations nationwide, they offer business, educational, research, and recreational opportunities to underserved LGBT communities via computer equipment and access to the Internet. As of 2021, the foundation has disbursed over $4,253,979 to recipients providing CyberCenters.

CyberCenter grant recipients
A selection of CyberCenter grant recipients includes:

LGBT leadership
The foundation has been a major and long-term supporter of the Gay & Lesbian Victory Fund, especially its LGBT Leadership Fellows aimed at training LGBT leaders for state and local governments; as of 2020 the Bohnett Leaders Fellowship at the Victory Institute has sent over 150 LGBT leaders to the Harvard Kennedy School’s Senior Executives in State and Local Government program since 2002. The David Bohnett LGBTQ Leaders Fellowship alumni have included Kyrsten Sinema, the first openly bisexual U.S. congressperson, and Annise Parker, one of the first openly gay mayors of a major U.S. city (Houston).

Leadership initiatives and voter education
The Bohnett foundation supports the development of the next generation of municipal leaders, through a variety of initiatives and grants.  As of 2021, the foundation has disbursed over $9,023,678 to recipients and programs in its leadership initiatives.

Leadership initiatives

David Bohnett Foundation leadership programs
The foundation supports advances in public policy through David Bohnett Leadership Fellows programs at universities. It funds graduate-school civic internship and leadership programs at:
 Gerald R. Ford School of Public Policy at the University of Michigan
 John F. Kennedy School of Government at Harvard University
 Robert F. Wagner Graduate School of Public Service at New York University
 UCLA Luskin School of Public Affairs

In other grants, in Detroit, New York City, and Los Angeles, graduate students receive positions in the mayor's office, and the stipends and tuition of these David Bohnett fellows are paid for by the Bohnett Foundation. These paid student interns have been involved in policy analysis and implementation, assisting speech writing, evaluating department heads, reducing homelessness, and other initiatives. Several former Bohnett mayoral fellows occupy management positions in the cities where they had interned, and in 2014 Stephanie Chang, a Bohnett fellow from the University of Michigan, became the first Asian-American woman elected to the Michigan state legislature.

David Bohnett Foundation Congressional interns
The foundation supports African American and Hispanic and Latino American student internships in the United States Congress. In partnership with the Congressional Black Caucus Foundation and the Congressional Hispanic Caucus Institute, summer internships offer students a private look into the United States' democratic process. In a series of educational opportunities within the United States Congress, students are encouraged to explore diversity through civic engagement, and build coalitions based on shared values, purpose and goals.

Voter education
The David Bohnett Foundation supports safe and secure elections, both during the voting process and after. They provide funding to projects that work to ensure fair elections, protect voting rights, and raise the level of political discourse among all Americans, regardless of age, gender identity, political party or other diversities. The foundation supports projects working at local, state and national levels on a wide range of voter registration initiatives, from preventing polling-place irregularities to research that helps assess obstacles that keep certain populations from having their votes counted. As of 2014, the foundation had disbursed over $4,500,000 exclusively to recipients working on voter education.

Voter education grant recipients
A selection of voter education recipients includes:

Gun violence prevention
The David Bohnett Foundation works with public policy makers, advocates and activists to reduce gun violence and promote gun violence prevention policies.  Funding is provided to groups and institutions that educate and advocate on the effects of guns and solutions to reduce gun violence. As of 2021, the foundation has disbursed over $5,124,1509 to recipients working on gun violence prevention.

Gun violence prevention grant recipients
A selection of gun violence prevention grant recipients includes, but is not limited to:

Animal language research
The David Bohnett Foundation supports animal language research, funding of service animals and eliminating the trade of endangered species. As of 2021, the foundation has disbursed over $2,049,088 to recipients working on animal language research.

Animal language research grant recipients
A selection of animal language research grant recipients includes:

See also

 Arcus Foundation
 Gill Foundation

References

External links
 

Foundations based in the United States
Organizations established in 1999
Non-profit organizations based in California
LGBT organizations in the United States
1999 establishments in California